This article lists events that occurred during 1928 in Estonia.

Incumbents

Events
The Estonian Central Federation of Veterans of the War of Independence was formed.

Births

Deaths

References

 
1920s in Estonia
Estonia
Estonia
Years of the 20th century in Estonia